Prairie Farmer is a weekly newspaper which covers agricultural and rural news in the state of Illinois. It was first published in 1841 in Chicago, Illinois by John Stephen Wright and was called The Union Agriculturist and Western Prairie Farmer. Its original masthead proclaimed that it was devoted to "western agriculture, mechanics, and education." Prairie Farmer is owned by Farm Progress, a subsidiary of British publisher Informa.

History
During his time as editor, Wright set up Prairie Farmer Warehouse at 112 Lake Street in Chicago where farmers could study samples of seed, plants, and farm machinery, as well as exhibit their own products. Upon its formation, Wright (not a farmer himself) proclaimed: 

In January 1843, the name of the paper was shortened to Prairie Farmer by Wright.

References 

 

Newspapers published in Illinois